Mateev Cove is the 700 m wide cove indenting for 290 m the south coast of Livingston Island in the South Shetland Islands, Antarctica.  Part of South Bay, entered east of Yasen Point.  Aldan Rock is the largest in a small group of rocks lying off the eastern part of the cove.
The UK base camp Station P operated at the cove's head during the 1957/58 summer season.

The cove is named after the Bulgarian physicist Matey Mateev (1940–2010) for his support for the Bulgarian Antarctic programme.

Location
British mapping in 1968, Chilean in 1971, Argentine in 1980, and Bulgarian in 2005 and 2009.

Maps
 L.L. Ivanov et al. Antarctica: Livingston Island and Greenwich Island, South Shetland Islands. Scale 1:100000 topographic map. Sofia: Antarctic Place-names Commission of Bulgaria, 2005.
 L.L. Ivanov. Antarctica: Livingston Island and Greenwich, Robert, Snow and Smith Islands. Scale 1:120000 topographic map.  Troyan: Manfred Wörner Foundation, 2009.  
 Antarctic Digital Database (ADD). Scale 1:250000 topographic map of Antarctica. Scientific Committee on Antarctic Research (SCAR). Since 1993, regularly upgraded and updated.
 L.L. Ivanov. Antarctica: Livingston Island and Smith Island. Scale 1:100000 topographic map. Manfred Wörner Foundation, 2017.

References
 Bulgarian Antarctic Gazetteer. Antarctic Place-names Commission. (details in Bulgarian, basic data in English)
 Mateev Cove. SCAR Composite Gazetteer of Antarctica.

External links
 Mateev Cove. Copernix satellite image

Coves of Livingston Island
Bulgaria and the Antarctic